Urhan may refer to:

 Urhan (Ireland), a townland on the Beara Peninsula, Ireland 
 Chrétien Urhan (1790-1845), viola player